This is a list of Continental currency banknotes, which were printed from 1775 through 1779.

1775

1776

1777

1778

1779

See also 
 Banknotes of the United States dollar
 Continental Currency dollar coin
 Fugio cent

References 

Banknotes of the United States
Historical currencies of the United States